Shishman was a contender for the Bulgarian throne in exile, third son of tsar Michael Shishman (r. 1323–1330). He was named after his grandfather Shishman of Vidin and was probably born in the capital of the Bulgarian Empire Tarnovo.

Background

His father, Michael Shishman led aggressive policy in the Balkans, in an attempt to extend the size of Bulgaria to that during the reign of Ivan Asen II (1218–1241). The Byzantine Empire suffered some setbacks and had to agree to concessions in Thrace but Michael Shishman could not achieve a decisive success. He eventually allied with the Byzantines against Serbia and divorced with his Serbian wife Anna Neda. In 1330 the Serbs defeated the Bulgarian army in battle of Velbazhd, in which the Bulgarian tsar perished. After the battle the two sides negotiated peace in the locality Mraka and it was decided that the eldest son of Michael Shishman – Ivan Stephen would succeed his father as emperor.

Eight months later, in 1331, Ivan Stephen was overthrown in a palace coup by Ivan Alexander (1331–1371), son of Michael Shishman's sister. Anna Neda and her sons had to flee to Serbia.

Rule in exile

Shishman did not follow his family and fled to Constantinople. He was immediately sent to the Byzantine regent and later emperor John VI Kantakouzenos, who acknowledged him as Emperor of Bulgaria. That act infuriated Ivan Alexander who demanded that Shishman must be deported to Bulgaria and threatened with war. John VI Kantakouzenos answered that in case of war the Byzantines would transport Shishman to Vidin with ships where the proximity with his family's domains would eventually lead to a civil war.

In 1331 Ivan Alexander launched a campaign, assembled his army at Sliven and marched to the south. The Bulgarians and the Byzantines under Andronikos III Palaiologos and Shishman fought a battle near Adrianople which ended without a clear victor or in a minor Byzantine victory and a peace treaty was signed. After that event Shishman is not mentioned in the historical sources.

Sources
 Fine, John Van Antwerp (1994). The Late Medieval Balkans: A Critical Survey from the Late Twelfth Century to the Ottoman Conquest. University of Michigan Press. .

Bulgarian princes
14th-century births
14th-century deaths
14th-century Bulgarian people
Shishman dynasty